Samuel "Sam" Jones  (born 1866) was a Welsh international footballer. He was part of the Wales national football team between 1887 and 1890, playing 2 matches. He played his first match on 12 March 1887 against Ireland and his last match on 22 March 1890 against Scotland.

Club career
At club level, he played for Wrexham and Chester City.
He also captained Caergwrle Wanderers from 1892-1895.

See also
 List of Wales international footballers (alphabetical)

References

1866 births

Place of birth missing

Date of death missing

Year of death missing
Welsh footballers

Wales international footballers
Wrexham A.F.C. players
Chester City F.C. players
Association footballers not categorized by position